William Ferguson Farm is a historic home and farm located in Wallace Township, Chester County, Pennsylvania.  The farm has three contributing buildings, two contributing sites, and one contributing structure.  They include the main house, a residence converted in 1957 from a former carriage house and granary, and Georgian and Federal style tenant house.  The main house is in two sections; the earlier dates to 1741 and the latter from about 1830.  It is a -story, six-bay by two-bay, fieldstone dwelling in the Georgian style.

It was added to the National Register of Historic Places in 1980.

References

Farms on the National Register of Historic Places in Pennsylvania
Georgian architecture in Pennsylvania
Federal architecture in Pennsylvania
Houses completed in 1830
Houses in Chester County, Pennsylvania
1830 establishments in Pennsylvania
National Register of Historic Places in Chester County, Pennsylvania